Philip McDonald may refer to:

Phil McDonald, audio engineer
Phil McDonald, a political candidate who stood thrice in Buller (New Zealand electorate)
Philip McDonald, character in The Angelic Conversation (film)
Phillip McDonald (born 1989), basketball player

See also
Philip MacDonald (disambiguation)